Kim Kristian Holmen (born 14 July 1982 in Oslo) is a Norwegian football striker who plays for Lyn Fotball.
 
His record on the 40-meter is 4.63. This is the fastest speed ever seen in the Norwegian academy Toppidrettssenteret.

Career statistics

References

Kim Holmen career stats at lynfotball.net

1982 births
Living people
Footballers from Oslo
Norwegian footballers
Skeid Fotball players
Lyn Fotball players
Kongsvinger IL Toppfotball players
Ullensaker/Kisa IL players
Eliteserien players
Norwegian First Division players

Association football forwards